A Time for George Stavros was an early, unpublished, non-science fiction novel by author Philip K. Dick. It was written sometime around 1955, a time when Dick was getting his science fiction published but still dreamed of being a mainstream writer.

Plot introduction
According to Lawrence Sutin's book, Divine Invasions: A Life of Philip K. Dick, (1989) the plot survives only as an index card synopsis from the publisher dated 24 October 1956, after the manuscript had already been rejected one time. The reader's comments on the rewrite as follows:

"Didn't like this before & still don't. Long, rambling, glum novel about 65 yr old Greek immigrant who has a weakling son, a second son about whom he's indifferent, a wife who doesn't love him (She's being unfaithful to him). Nothing much happens. Guy, selling garage & retiring, tries to buy another garage in new development, has a couple of falls, dies at end. Point is murky but seems to be that world is disintegrating, Stavros supposed to be symbol of vigorous individuality now a lost commodity."

In a letter from 1960, the author himself commented on the title character in an unexpectedly optimistic fashion:

"Contact with vile persons does not blight or contaminate or doom the really superior; a man can go on and be successful, if he just keeps struggling. There is no trick that the wicked can play on the good that will ultimately be successful; the good are protected by God, or at least by their virtue."

References

Bibliography
Bibliography of Philip K. Dick

1950s novels
Lost books
Novels by Philip K. Dick